Louise Bourgoin (born Ariane Louise Bourgoin, 28 November 1981) is a French actress, model and television presenter.

Life and career 

She was born on 28 November 1981 in Rennes. Bourgoin's parents, both secondary level teachers, encouraged her to pursue a stable career. She studied for five years at the École des Beaux-Arts in Rennes. She became a plastic arts teacher while simultaneously beginning to work as a model; some of her most notable early work as a model was for the photographer Ian Sanderson.

After graduating in 2004, Bourgoin became a presenter for the television program Kawaï ! on Filles TV channel. Two years later, she made a brief appearance on Direct 8. At the same time, she worked with TV presenter Marc Lacombe on a pilot program for PlayStation TV. This television channel never started broadcasting, and the pilot was never distributed.

In 2006, she worked as the weather girl for Le Grand Journal with Michel Denisot, which broadcast nightly on Canal+. To avoid audiences confusing her for fellow Le Grand Journal presenter, Ariane Massenet, she chose the name "Louise Bourgoin" as a tribute to her favorite sculptor, Louise Bourgeois.

In 2007, she was offered a role in a film, playing a television weather girl in The Girl From Monaco. Subsequently, she played in several films including The Extraordinary Adventures of Adèle Blanc-Sec directed by Luc Besson and Black Heaven directed by Gilles Marchand, a film that was screened Out of Competition at the 2010 Cannes Film Festival.

Personal life 
In December 2015, it was announced that Bourgoin and electronic musician Tepr were expecting their first child. Bourgoin gave birth to her son, Étienne, on 7 April 2016.

Filmography

References

External links 

 
 Art book

Living people
1981 births
French film actresses
Actors from Rennes
École des Beaux-Arts alumni
French female models
French television presenters
21st-century French actresses
French women television presenters
Mass media people from Rennes